The abbreviation LTUC may refer to:

The Lesotho Trade Union Congress, national trade union center in Lesotho
The London Transport Users Committee, a British consumer organization now known as London TravelWatch